Nikolai Zuyev may refer to:

* Nikolai Zuyev (badminton), Russian badminton player
 Nikolai Zouev, Russian mixed martial arts fighter active in the Fighting Network Rings
 Nikolai Vasilyevich Zuyev (born 1975), Russian footballer